River Center, or variants thereof, can refer to:

RiverCenter for the Performing Arts, a modern performance space in Columbus, Georgia
Davenport RiverCenter, a convention center complex located in Davenport, Iowa
Baton Rouge River Center, a convention center complex located in Baton Rouge, Louisiana
RiverCentre, a convention center located in Saint Paul, Minnesota
Valley River Center, a shopping mall in Eugene, Oregon
Rivercenter, a shopping mall in San Antonio, Texas